Kilnam Chon (Hangul: 전길남; born 3 January 1943) is a South Korean computer scientist. As a result of his contributions, South Korea became the second country in the world to have the IPv4 network (the Internet), after the United States.<IEEE Communications Magazine, February 2013>

Born in [Japan], in 1943. He graduated from Osaka University with a Bachelor of Science degree in electrical engineering in 1965, and then a Ph.D in Systems Engineering from UCLA in 1974. He worked as a computer system designer at Rockwell International and a member of technical staff at the Jet Propulsion Laboratory until 1979. After returning to South Korea at the age of 36 in 1979, he worked as a researcher at the Korea Institute of Electronics Technology which became Electronics and Telecommunications Research Institute later. From 1982 to 2008, he was a professor of computer science at KAIST.

Chon produced many talents in the System Architecture Lab (SA Lab) he directed.

In May 1982, he helped develop IPv4 network (the internet) between Seoul National University and the Korea Institute of Electronics Technology. As a result, South Korea became the second country in the world to be largely connected to the Internet, after the United States, and he is called "the father of Korean Internet".<IEEE Communications Magazine, February 2013. In addition, on 23 April 2012, he was inducted into the Internet Society's Internet Hall of Fame in their Global connectors category.

He retired from KAIST in 2008 and became a professor emeritus there. Afterwards, he became a visiting professor at Tsinghua University in 2008. He  was a professor at Keio University's Shonan Fujisawa campus in their policy and media research department.<https://cosmos.kaist.ac.kr>

Research fields 
His research fields include the Internet, systems engineering, and human-computer interactions.

Awards 
 2012.4.23 Internet Hall of Fame, Global connectors
 2003.06.23 World Technology Summit World Technology Awards Communication Technology Individual Award
 1997 Ministry of Information and Communication of South Korea Information Culture Center National Medal
 1996 Scientist of the Year Award, Korea Science Journalists Association
 1980 Presidential Award (Gilin National Medal) Mountain Climbing.

See also 
 Internet Hall of Fame

Read more 
 2005.02.03 I look back on Internet history.
 2005.04.04 KAIST Professor Kilnam Chon's passion for 20 years
 2013.10.13 KAIST Professor of 20 years, Korea's Father of the Internet Kilnam Chon

References

External links 
 Home page

1943 births
Living people
People from Osaka
Zainichi Korean people
South Korean computer scientists
University of California, Los Angeles alumni
Osaka University alumni
Academic staff of KAIST
Academic staff of Keio University
Academic staff of Peking University
Internet pioneers